Yaraguppi is a village in Dharwad district of Karnataka, India.

Demographics
As of the 2011 Census of India there were 816 households in Yaraguppi and a total population of 4,055 consisting of 2,076 males and 1,979 females. There were 507 children ages 0-6.

References

Villages in Dharwad district